This is a list of steak dishes. Steak is generally a cut of beef sliced perpendicular to the muscle fibers, or of fish cut perpendicular to the spine.  Meat steaks are usually grilled, pan-fried, or broiled, while fish steaks may also be baked. 
Meat cooked in sauce, such as steak and kidney pie, or minced meat formed into a steak shape, such as Salisbury steak and hamburger steak may also be referred to as steak.

Beef

Beefsteak is a flat cut of beef, usually cut perpendicular to the muscle fibers. Beefsteaks are usually grilled, pan-fried, or broiled. The more tender cuts from the loin and rib are cooked quickly, using dry heat, and served whole.  Less tender cuts from the chuck or round are cooked with moist heat or are mechanically tenderized (e.g. cube steak).
  – some asado dishes use beef steak
 
 
 
 
 
 
 
 
 
 
 
 
 
  – term originally referred to the cut of beef used in the dish which is known as skirt steak.

Fish
Fish steak is a cut of fish which is cut perpendicular to the spine and includes the bones. Fish steaks can be contrasted with fish fillets, which are cut parallel to either side of the spine and do not include the larger bones. Fish steaks can be grilled, pan-fried, broiled or baked.
 Kabkabou – fish and tomato stew traditionally prepared in Tunisia with fish steak, capers, olives and lemon

Pork
Pork steak is generally cut from the shoulder of the pig, but can also be cut from the loin or leg of the pig. Shoulder steaks are cut from the same primal cut of meat most commonly used for pulled pork, and can be quite tough without long cooking times due to the high amount of collagen in the meat, therefore, pork shoulder steaks are often cooked slower than a typical beef steak, and are often stewed or simmered in barbecue sauce during cooking. 

 Kotellet
 Pork chop
 Pork chop bun
 Twice cooked pork – well-known Sichuan-style Chinese dish prepared by simmering pork belly steaks in water with spices, then refrigerating and slicing it, and lastly shallow frying in oil in a wok.

Vegetables, mushrooms, etc. 
 Portobello mushroom steak
 Tofu steak
 Steak fries, in the US and Canada, are fried potato wedges cut larger than regular French fries

Steak sauces
Steak sauce is a dark brown sauce commonly served as a condiment for beef in the United States. The original sauce which  'steak sauce' is derived from is known in Britain as "brown sauce".  Also derived from "brown sauce" in Japan tonkatsu sauce  has a slight variation in ingredients.

See also

 List of beef dishes
 List of fish dishes
 List of pork dishes
 List of foods
 Restructured steak

References

Beef dishes
Steak
Dishes